Wanzleben is a town and a former municipality in the Börde district, in Sachsen-Anhalt, Germany. Between 2004 and 2010 it was the seat of the Verwaltungsgemeinschaft Börde Wanzleben. Since 1 January 2010, it is part of the town Wanzleben-Börde. It is situated approximately 15 km southwest of Magdeburg.

People 
 Martin Bangemann (1934–2022), politician

References 

Former municipalities in Saxony-Anhalt
Wanzleben-Börde

ro:Wanzleben